Gebke (also: Kohlwedder Bach) is a river of North Rhine-Westphalia, Germany. It is right tributary of the Ruhr in Meschede.

See also
List of rivers of North Rhine-Westphalia

References

Rivers of North Rhine-Westphalia
Rivers of Germany